John Alexander Lackey House is a historic home located at Morganton, Burke County, North Carolina.  It was built about 1900, and is a two-story, "T"-shaped, gable roofed, brick farmhouse. It has a one-story, gabled kitchen wing. The house features Colonial Revival style detailing.

It was listed on the National Register of Historic Places in 1987.

References

Houses on the National Register of Historic Places in North Carolina
Colonial Revival architecture in North Carolina
Houses completed in 1900
Houses in Burke County, North Carolina
National Register of Historic Places in Burke County, North Carolina